Miss India Worldwide 2015 was the 24th edition of the Miss India Worldwide pageant, held on 5 September 2015. The event was held at Lalit Hotel in Mumbai, India. 

Monica Gill of the United States crowned her successor Stephanie Lohale of Oman at the end of the event.

Results

Special awards

Contestants 
32 contestants competed for the title of Miss India Worldwide 2015.

Judges
The Miss India Worldwide 2015 final judges were:

Richa Sharma
Hrishitaa Bhatt
Niharika Raizada
Nikkitasha Marwah
Sandeep Soparkar
Raj Suri
Alesia Raut

Contestant notes 
Natasha Jabul, has Mauritian origins on her parents' side.
Samantha Rodrigues, is born in Guyana.

Crossovers 
Contestants who previously competed at other national and international beauty pageants:

 – Ritu Pamnani placed top 5 at Miss India United Arab Emirates 2015.
 – Apeksha Porwal represented India at Miss Teen International 2009 in Chicago. She was Femina Miss India Delhi 2015 but she unplaced at Femina Miss India 2015. She has finished 2st runner-up at Miss Diva 2017.
 – Veena Gurbani was Miss South Asia USA 2014 and Miss India Global 2017.
 – Advaita Shetty had competed at Miss Teen International New Zealand 2014 and placed 3rd runner-up. She has finished 1st runner-up at Miss India Worldwide New Zealand 2014.
- Dr. Ashita Munjely was Miss Himachal Face of The Year 2015. She was also crowned as Miss Himachal Runner up and Miss Himachal- Miss Style Diva 2015.  She had also won Miss Tiara. She also won Miss SGMU 2018.

References

2015 beauty pageants in India